The WSKG Public Telecommunications Council, Inc. (WSKG, Inc.) is a non-profit public broadcasting organization serving Central, Western, and the Southern Tier of New York State, and Northeast Pennsylvania, with offices based in Vestal (near Binghamton).

WSKG, Inc. owns and operates the following stations:

 WSKG-TV, a PBS member station operating on virtual channel 46, digital 31; repeated in digital on WSKA-DT channel 30 in Corning, New York
 WSKG-FM, an NPR member station, 89.3 FM, featuring news and public affairs, plus classical music
 WSQX-FM, an NPR member station, 91.5 FM, featuring news and public affairs from NPR, Pacifica, and other sources, plus jazz music.

Due to the hilly terrain of the Southern Tier region, WSKG's radio stations are retransmitted on various repeaters and translators throughout the region. WSKG originally also had a network of low-powered television repeaters as well, but were shut down due to high costs.

WSKG, Inc. was also a license holder for WIOX, 91.3 FM, in Roxbury, New York (Delaware County) until it was sold in 2018.

External links
WSKG Official Site

Television broadcasting companies of the United States
Radio broadcasting companies of the United States
Public broadcasting in the United States